Dorothy Gay Richardson (born September 22, 1961) is an American physician and former two-time gold medal-winning Olympian softball player at shortstop. Richardson is currently the head coach at Liberty. Richardson played college softball at UCLA and won the inaugural NCAA Division I softball tournament in 1982. She is a USA Softball Hall of Fame honoree.

Education
Richardson attended Western Illinois University for one year and the University of California Los Angeles for four years.  Richardson has a master's degree in exercise physiology and health from Adelphi University in Garden City, New York.   She attended the University of Louisville School of Medicine and received an M.D. degree in 1993. She then entered her five-year orthopedic residency program at the University of Southern California. She took a one-year leave of absence to participate in the 1996 Olympic Games, where she and her teammates captured the first ever Olympic gold medal in softball. Between 1999 and 2000, she did a fellowship in sports medicine at the Kerlan-Jobe Orthopedic Sports Medicine Clinic in Los Angeles.

Softball career
Dot began her softball career in 1972 playing for the Union Park Jets in Orlando. In early 1975, at the age of 13, Dot was a member of the Orlando Rebels in the ASA (Amateur Softball Association of America), She became the youngest player ever to play in the ASA Women's Major Fast-Pitch National Championships. After graduating from Colonial High School in Orlando, Richardson played for Western Illinois, before transferring to UCLA, where she played for the UCLA Bruins from 1980 to 1984. While there she helped the Bruins win their first NCAA championship in 1982.

After college Dot played professionally, starting her career in Orlando with the Florida Rebels. She then joined the Raybestos Brakettes of Stratford, Connecticut in 1984, where she remained until 1994. She ended her professional career with the California Commotion of Woodland Hills, California.

Richardson was a key part of the United States national team that won the gold medal during the sport's Olympic debut in 1996 hitting the home run that won the game. She was also part of the 2000 gold medal-winning team in Sydney. After her win at the Olympics, she continued with her career as an orthopedic surgeon. Dot Richardson was Executive Director and Medical Director of the National Training Center until 2012. She is the head softball coach at Liberty University, in Lynchburg, Virginia. Richardson now serves as a board chair for the Fellowship of Christian Athletes Softball Ministry, where her husband Bob Pinto is the national director.

Coaching career
Richardson was named as the head softball coach at Liberty University on July 17, 2013. The Flames have shown improvement in each of Richardson's first five seasons. After an 11–46 record her first season in 2014, Liberty won 29 games in 2015. Richardson then posted her first winning record in 2016 and followed that year with two straight regular season Big South titles in 2017 and 2018 with 45+ wins in both seasons, winning the Big South conference tournament in 2018 and receiving a regional automatic qualifying spot to play at South Carolina. Richardson also coached the Flames to the NISC postseason tournament title in 2017.

Awards
Richardson is the recipient of the 1998 Sports Legends Award, the 1997 Babe Zaharias Award (Female Athlete of the Year), the 1996 Amateur Athletic Foundation Athlete of the Year, inducted into the UCLA Hall of Fame in 1996, Nuprin Comeback of the Year Award in 1990, four-time Sullivan Award nominee and inducted into the Florida State Hall of Fame in 1999. Her college honors include NCAA Player of the Decade (1980s), three-time NCAA All-American, two-time AIAW All-American, three-time UCLA MVP and 1983 All University Award at UCLA. She was named MVP in the Women's Major Fast Pitch National Championship four times. She is an inductee of the National Softball Hall of Fame.

Statistics

UCLA Bruins

Team USA

Head coaching record

References

 
 http://www.liberty.edu/flames/index.cfm?PID=36961&teamID=2&CFID=3157509&CFTOKEN=70025606

External links
 

 

1961 births
Living people
American softball coaches
American orthopedic surgeons
American sports physicians
UCLA Bruins softball players
Liberty Lady Flames softball coaches
Olympic softball players of the United States
Olympic gold medalists for the United States in softball
Softball players at the 1996 Summer Olympics
Softball players at the 2000 Summer Olympics
Medalists at the 1996 Summer Olympics
Medalists at the 2000 Summer Olympics
Colonial High School alumni
Adelphi University alumni
Western Illinois University alumni
University of Louisville School of Medicine alumni
University of Southern California alumni
Sportspeople from Orlando, Florida
Softball players from Florida